Between Towns Road is a major road in the area of Cowley, in the city of Oxford, England.

Location
The road passes the Templars Square Shopping Centre on one side and Templars Retail Park on the other. It adjoins Church Cowley Road to the west and forms a junction with Oxford Road and Garsington Road to the east.

History

The road is named after a local field called "Betwixt the Towns", dating from around 1630, subsequently spelt "Between Roads" in 1853 when the road was created. It was originally called Surman's Lane, then High Street, Cowley. The road was named "Between Towns Road" in 1930.

Oxfordshire History Centre, nearby in Oxford Road, was completed in 1938 as the Church of England parish church of St Luke. The church declared redundant in 1993 and reopened as the Oxfordshire Record Office (now Oxford History Centre) in 2000.

Cowley Centre, a shopping centre designed by the Oxford City Architects EG Chandler and Douglas Murray, was built here in 1960–65. Between Towns Road was realigned when Cowley Centre was built. The shopping centre was renamed to Templars Square in 1989.

References

1853 establishments in England
Shopping streets in Oxford